The Congress of the People (COP) is a political party in Trinidad and Tobago. Its current political leader is Kirt Sinnette. Its symbol is the "Circle of Circles".

History 
The party was formed on 10 September 2006 by Winston Dookeran, then the embattled Political Leader of the United National Congress announced at a rally that he was leaving the UNC and forming a new party. Dookeran and his supporters had been engaged in internal party feuding with the UNC executive which was loyal to party founder (then chairman and former Leader) Basdeo Panday.

Dookeran was soon joined by UNC MPs Ganga Singh (who became the Party Whip) and Manohar Ramsaran. Two Independent MPs who had previously left the UNC, Gillian Lucky and Gerald Yetming, also joined the new party.

Former UNC Senators Robin Montano, Roy Augustus, Carolyn Seepersad-Bachan and Sadiq Baksh also joined. Additionally, the entire Constituency Executives for Chaguanas and San Fernando West also quit the UNC. The support for Dookeran served as the catalyst for the formation of the new movement.

After the internal elections of the United National Congress Dookeran, accompanied by then-Senator Sadiq Baksh, began meeting with the members and supporters of the UNC. It was during these meetings that many got involved with Dookeran's campaign and he began working the Tabaquite Constituency promoting the concept of New Politics. Hundreds of supporters working with grass-roots members of the Tabaquite Constituency worked to develop a strategic plan document which detailed numerous strategies to address the social and economic needs of the people of the constituency. This plan was submitted to Dookeran, who later adopted its recommendations and suggested that similar plans be developed for all 41 Constituencies.

On a Morning Edition program in November 2005, a supporter of Dookeran announced that the members and supporters of the Tabaquite UNC Party Group # 3255 had thrown their support behind Dookeran and called on then Member of Parliament Dr. Adesh Nanan to support the duly-elected Political Leader of the UNC.

This was the beginning of the work that led to the groundswell of support for the UNC Political Leader and later became the strongest support base for Dookeran and the New Politics.

On 23 July 2006 a supporter interrupted the proceeding at the Hindu Credit Union Convention Center and read aloud what later became known as the Freeport Declaration, calling on Dookeran to leave the UNC and follow the desire of the thousands gathered there toward the formation of a "New Political Vehicle."

Dookeran's New Politics 
The Philosophy of New Politics was a concept that stemmed from opposition to Basdeo Panday stating his philosophy that 'Politics has a Morality of its own'. The 'New Politics' sought to uphold good governance and integrity as principles of political behaviour. The constituency of Tabaquite was considered 'ground zero' during the 2007 Parliamentary Elections. The COP managed to field the popular newspaper columnist and high profile Attorney Anand Ramlogan as Candidate for the COP in that race. He was among a field of impressive former UNC and NAR politicians along with several new faces.

In parliamentary elections 2007, the COP had built momentum and at one stage, after holding a massive rally in Woodford Square, Port of Spain, had many analysts predicting an upset at the polls. The UNC however managed to make a comeback by campaigning on the basis that the COP would 'split the vote' allowing the PNM to regain power. After the election it was revealed the COP had gained the highest ever votes by a third party in Trinidad and Tobago history. The Party won no Seats in Parliament but made impressive tallies in the East-West Corridor and Diego Martin areas.

The UNC held 15 seats in its South and Central base but blamed the COP for the loss of several marginal seats handing the PNM a wider victory. The COP continued to exist doing community work and leading various campaigns and discussions. The COP had been openly approaching Kamla Persad-Bissessar to join its party and she eventually was the first member of the UNC to attend a COP convention.

The PNM had a large majority but faced with mounting allegations of corruption, Prime Minister Patrick Manning called an election in 2010, more than two years before it was due. The COP entered into a pact called the 'Fyzabad Declaration' where Kamla Persad-Bissessar who had recently been elected Political Leader of the UNC, would lead an electoral arrangement of several interest groups to the polls. In the parliamentary elections held on 24 May 2010, the party joined forces with four other political parties, including the UNC, to form the People's Partnership. The People's Partnership won the election convincingly. The UNC won 21 seats, COP won 6 seats and TOP won 2 seats and PNM just 12 seats.

Joseph Toney who was then Chairman of the COP, but not a candidate, took on the role of watchdog as the COP sought to distinguish itself from the UNC even while part of the governing coalition. The COP made public its uneasiness with issues concerning Jack Warner and its share of local government and state board appointments. Winston Dookeran, then Minister of Finance, stepped down before party leadership elections in 2011 where Prakash Ramadhar defeated Anil Roberts and Vernon De Lima to succeed Dookeran as the Political Leader of COP.

Thereafter under the Leadership of Prakash Ramadhar the COP saw many internal conflicts as the party became divided on its participation in the coalition with the United National Congress. The majority of COP supporters becoming disenchanted started clamouring for Ramadhar's resignation and for the COP to leave the Peoples Partnership Government. Leading this charge were three dissident members the Political Leader's brother Kishore Ramadhar, Rudolph Hanamji the party's chairman in Diego Martin West and the former chairman Satu-Ann Ramcharan, the dissidents were finally suspended from the party with Political Leader Prakash Ramadhar accusing the Dissidents of betraying the party. This action has subsequently resulted in a high court action taken by the dissidents ) Ramadhar, Ramcharan and Hanamji) in which Prakash Ramadhar and the chairman, Carolyn Seepersad- Bachan have been found guilty of defaming the three dissidents. The judgement Justice Kokaram says that this is a case of the good politics gone awry and condemned Prakash Ramadhar as a clear case of the Political Leader using his power to bolster his position and the relationship with the People's Partnership government to the detriment of the reputation of the dissidents. " Far from a legitimate reply to an attack of his leadership it was a collateral and un-related attack on the claimants with the intention of bolstering his position as leader of the party and the direction of the party at the expense of the claimants reputation ..... his attack can be characterized as a disproportionate response designed to destroy his opponents and silence his detractors" (Claim CV 2014-02122 High Court of Trinidad and Tobago – Judge Vashist Kokaram).

The rift between the COP hierarchy and its membership continued to widen resulting in mass defections during the election campaign of 2015 and the People's Partnership government losing the elections and all COP candidates being defeated at the polls save and except Prakash Ramadhar who retained his seat in a UNC stronghold constituency

2015 general elections 

The Congress of the People (COP) was a partner party within the People's Partnership coalition which contested the 2015 general elections in Trinidad & Tobago. However, the COP contested eight (8) seats, but was only able to secure the St. Augustine seat, which was held by its political leader, Mr. Prakash Ramadhar. As a result of their election defeat at the polls, the COP together with the United National Congress (UNC) formed the opposition.

References

External links
 Congress of the People Official website of the Congress of the People.

Political parties in Trinidad and Tobago
Political parties established in 2006